Kim Hye-mi (born 16 April 1983) is a South Korean taekwondo practitioner. 

She won a gold medal in welterweight at the 2001 World Taekwondo Championships, and a gold medal at the 2002 Asian Taekwondo Championships.

References

External links

1983 births
Living people
South Korean female taekwondo practitioners
World Taekwondo Championships medalists
Asian Taekwondo Championships medalists
21st-century South Korean women